The Monster World Tour was a concert tour by the American hard rock group Kiss in support of their 20th studio album, Monster. Fresh off the heels of the recent success of The Tour with Mötley Crüe and the second annual KISS Kruise, the tour officially began on November 7, 2012, in Buenos Aires, Argentina. Kiss played shows in Australia for the first time since 2008, and Europe, including a few festivals in June. They played their longest Canadian tour to date in July through early August with a few US concerts following after, including a show taped to air during halftime of ArenaBowl XXVI in Orlando, Florida. They played in Japan for the first time since 2006 in October 2013.

The new stage show, first used in the European leg, involved a giant robotic spider that moved across the stage and all four members were lifted into the air. The spider shot pyro from its legs and had eyes that glowed.

In the tour program for the band's final tour, Simmons reflected on the tour:

Setlists

South American leg setlist
 "Detroit Rock City"
 "Shout It Out Loud"
 "Calling Dr. Love"
 "Hell or Hallelujah"
 "Wall of Sound"
 "Hotter Than Hell"
 "I Love It Loud"
 "Outta This World" (Tommy Thayer and Eric Singer duet)
 "God of Thunder" (Gene Simmons solo)
 "Psycho Circus"
 "War Machine"
 "Love Gun"
 "Black Diamond"
Encore
 "Lick It Up"
 "I Was Made for Lovin' You"
 "Rock and Roll All Nite"

Australian leg setlist
 "Detroit Rock City"
 "Shout It Out Loud"
 "Deuce"
 "Firehouse" (Simmons spits fire)
 "Hell or Hallelujah"
 "Calling Dr. Love"
 "Outta This World" (Thayer and Singer jamming together)
 "Psycho Circus"
 "I Love It Loud" (Simmons' bass solo intro – spits blood and flies)
 "Crazy Crazy Nights"
 "War Machine"
 "Love Gun" (Stanley flies out to the audience)
 "Rock and Roll All Nite"

Encore

 "Lick It Up"
 "Black Diamond"

 "Crazy Crazy Nights" not played in Perth.
 "Shock Me" was played instead of "Outta This World" in Sydney (2nd night).
 "Christine Sixteen" only played in Melbourne (1st night).
 "Hotter Than Hell" was played instead of "Firehouse" in Sydney (2nd night).
 "Wall of Sound" only played in Perth.
 "I Was Made for Lovin' You" only played in Perth, Adelaide and Melbourne (1st night).
 "Shandi" only played in Perth, Adelaide and Mackay.
 "God of Thunder" only played in Perth and Adelaide.
 "Deuce" not played in Perth, Adelaide and Melbourne (1st night).

European/North American leg setlist
 "Psycho Circus"
 "Shout It Out Loud"
 "Let Me Go, Rock 'n' Roll"
 "I Love It Loud"
 "Hell or Hallelujah"
 "War Machine" (Simmons spits fire)
 "Heaven's on Fire"
 "Deuce" or "Calling Dr. Love"
 "Say Yeah"
 "Shock Me"/"Outta This World" (Thayer and Singer jamming together)
 "God of Thunder (Simmons' bass solo intro – spits blood and flies)
 "Lick It Up"
 "Love Gun" (Stanley flies out to the audience)
 "Rock and Roll All Nite"

Encore

 "Detroit Rock City''
 "I Was Made for Lovin' You"
 "Black Diamond"

 "Heaven's on Fire" not played in Solvesborg and Clisson.
 "I Was Made for Lovin' You" not played in Clisson.
 "Calling Dr. Love" only played in Solvesberg, Udine, Toronto and Montreal through all US dates.
 "Deuce" not played in Udine, Toronto and Montreal through all US dates.
 "Rock and Roll All Nite" and "Black Diamond" switched places after Edmonton show.
 "Do You Love Me" only played in Calgary.

Japanese leg setlist

 "Psycho Circus"
 "Shout It Out Loud"
 "Do You Love Me"
 "I Love It Loud"
 "Hell or Hallelujah"
 "War Machine" (Simmons spits fire)
 "Sukiyaki" (Kyu Sakamoto cover)
 "Heaven's on Fire"
 "Calling Dr. Love"
 "Say Yeah"
 "Shock Me"/"Outta This World" (Thayer and Singer jamming together)
 "God of Thunder" (Simmons' bass solo intro – spits blood and flies)
 "Lick It Up"
 "Love Gun" (Stanley flies out to the audience)
 "Black Diamond"

Encore

 "Detroit Rock City''
 "I Was Made for Lovin' You"
 "Rock and Roll All Nite"

 "Black Diamond" and "Rock and Roll All Nite" switched places in Chiba.

Support acts
 Rosa Tattooada (Porto Alegre, Brazil)
 Diva Demolition (Australia)
 Thin Lizzy (Australia)
 Mötley Crüe (Australia)
 Satan Takes A Holiday (Sweden)
 Hardcore Superstar (Sweden)
 Reckless Love (Finland)
 Kvelertak (Norway)
 Ingenting (Norway)
 Five Finger Death Punch (Germany)
 Bitch & Chips (Czech Republic)
 Rival Sons (Zurich)
 Shinedown (Canada)
 Leogun (United States)

Tour dates

Box office score data

 Top 100 Worldwide Mid Year Tours 2013: KISS/Mötley Crüe, #84

Personnel

Kiss
 Paul Stanley – vocals, rhythm guitar
 Gene Simmons – vocals, bass
 Tommy Thayer – lead guitar, vocals
 Eric Singer – drums, vocals

References

Notes

Citations

Kiss (band) concert tours
2012 concert tours
2013 concert tours
Concert tours of South America
Concert tours of Australia
Concert tours of Japan
Concert tours of North America